The Trichiini are a tribe of the scarab beetle family (Scarabaeidae), though historically they were often classified as a subfamily, Trichiinae. The conspicuous bee beetles (Trichius) are probably the best-known genus in Europe.

They vary in size from 6 to 65 mm  and can be distinguished from Cetoniini by having covered epimeres, and lateral edges of the elytra which are not trimmed.

The adults feed on sugar-rich secretions of stems, leaves, fruits and flowers of different plants. Most larvae develop in rotten wood.

Genera

Subtribus Cryptodontina
Coelocorynus Kolbe, 1895
Cryptodontes Burmeister, 1847
Subtribus Incaina
Archedinus  Morón & Krikken, 1990
Coelocratus Burmeister, 1841
Golinca Thomson, 1878
Inca Lepeletier & Serville, 1828
Pantodinus Burmeister, 1847
Subtribus Osmodermatina
Osmoderma Lepeletier & Serville, 1825
Platygeniops Krikken, 1978
Subtribus Platygeniina
Platygenia MacLeay, 1819
Subtribus Trichiina
Agnorimus Miyake et al., 1991
Apeltastes Howden, 1968
Brachagenius Kraatz, 1890
Calometopidius Bourgoin, 1917
Calometopus Blanchard, 1850
Campulipus Kirby, 1827
Chaetodermina Heller, 1921
Clastocnemis Burmeister, 1840
Corynotrichius Kolbe, 1891
Dialithus Parry, 1849

Diploa Kolbe, 1892
Diploeida Péringuey, 1907
Elpidus Péringuey, 1907
Endoxazus Kolbe, 1892
Epitrichius Tagawa, 1941
Eriopeltastes Burmeister, 1840
Giesbertiolus Howden, 1988
Glaphyronyx Moser, 1924
Gnorimella Casey, 1915

Gnorimus Lepeletier & Serville, 1825
 

Incala J. Thomson, 1858
Incalidia Janson, 1907
Lasiotrichius Reitter, 1898
Liotrichius Kolbe, 1892
Myodermides Ruter, 1964
Myodermum Burmeister, 1840
Paragnorimus Becker, 1910
Paratrichius Janson, 1881

Peltotrichius Howden, 1968
Pileotrichius Bourgoin, 1921
Polyplastus Janson, 1880
Stegopterus Burmeister, 1840
Stripsipher Gory & Percheron, 1833
Trichiomorphus Bourgoin, 1919
Trichiotinus Casey, 1915

Trichius Fabricius, 1787 – bee beetles
Trigonopeltastes Burmeister, 1840

Xiphoscelidus Péringuey, 1907

References

External links

List of the Oriental Trichiine Scarabs (with key)
Evans, Arthur H. Generic Guide to New World Scarabs
Inca clathrata
Trichius fasciatus

Cetoniinae
Beetle tribes